Bermuda men's national softball team is the national team for Bermuda.  The 1988 World Championships were held in Saskatoon, Canada.  The team played 13 games in the round robin round.  They finished thirteenth overall.

References

Men's national softball teams
National sports teams of Bermuda
Men's sport in Bermuda
Softball in Bermuda